
Malin 1 is a giant low surface brightness (LSB) spiral galaxy. It was discovered by astronomer David Malin in 1986 and is the first LSB galaxy verified to exist. The central spiral is a SB0a type barred-spiral.

Malin 1 is peculiar in several ways: its diameter alone would make it the largest barred spiral galaxy ever to have been observed.

Malin 1 was found later to be interacting with two other galaxies, Malin 1B and SDSS J123708.91+142253.2. Meanwhile, SDSS J123708.91+142253.2 is located within the huge, faint halo of Malin 1 and might have caused the formation of the extended low surface brightness disc through tidal stripping.

Observations by Galaz et al. in April 2014 revealed a detailed view of the spiral structure of Malin 1 in optical bands. Other details, such as possible stellar streams and formation regions, are revealed as well.

Gallery

See also
 NGC 6872, large interacting barred spiral galaxy claimed in 2013 as largest spiral galaxy
 NGC 262, huge lenticular galaxy discovered in 1885
 UGC 2885, a large unbarred spiral galaxy

References

External links

Barred spiral galaxies
Low surface brightness galaxies
Coma Berenices
42102
SDSS objects
Astronomical objects discovered in 1986